HackTX is a 24-hour annual hackathon hosted by Freetail Hackers, a Computer Science student organization at The University of Texas at Austin.

HackTX is open to all college students and held on the University of Texas at Austin's campus.

History

HackTX started in 2012, when student members of the Hacker Lounge and Technology Entrepreneurship Society wanted to host a hackathon that would gather students and companies from the Austin, TX community. A hackathon is an invention marathon, in which students gather to create a solution to a problem, a.k.a. hack. HackTX invites students of all backgrounds to participate whether they are beginners or non-technical majors.

To cover costs of the event, HackTX organizers raise capital from sponsoring companies. Companies are provided opportunities to interact with student hackers in the forms of mentoring and recruiting.

HackTX begins with a keynote address to all participants and a demonstration of sponsor APIs.  Participants then begin building their projects, of 'hacking'.  Projects may be software based, hardware based, or a combination of the two.

Participants are encouraged to work in teams of 3 to 5 members.  After 24 hours, participants submit their projects for judgement.

HackTX Winners

HackTX 2012

The first HackTX was held on the University of Texas at Austin's campus in Austin TX, October 19–20, 2012. It had attracted about 300 attendees.

On October 19, 2012,  engineers from The University of Texas and the surrounding area gathered for 24 hours at The University of Texas Austin's Student Activity Center for a celebration where guests freely engaged in open and unrestrained software and hardware development. The University's Technology Entrepreneurship Society and Hacker Lounge teamed up to create the event, combining the best of entrepreneurship and creative hacking ability at the university. Founder of Capital Factory and veteran Austin tech investor, Josh Baer, commented that this was the largest hackathon he has seen in Austin.

First place winners, Lynx Labs, developed music visualization software using a Microsoft Kinect sensor and won five Google Nexus 7 tablets. Second place team won five 23” Samsung monitors for their multi-factor identification physical entry device. The third place team developed an automated flashcard application to help students study for tests for the prize of three Apple TV's. Special prizes went to the product with the most market potential, TrivialMobile.com, an application that builds a mobile website from information submitted through email. The award for most creative project went to a rapid image transformation application for Windows, dubbed ‘Instagram for right-clicking.’ Twilio gave out two Spheros to a team who built software to control its 200-pound robot using text messages. Context.io awarded two ACL Live tickets to a team which built email analytics and visualization software.

Other supporters included the Murchison Chair of Free Enterprise, UT Events Co-Sponsorship Committee, RideScout, VMWare, ReturnPath, Alsop Louie, Palantir, Microsoft, HomeAway, InfoChimps, Rackspace, Twilio Communications and Indeed.com.

HackTX 2013

The second HackTX was held on the University of Texas at Austin's campus in Austin TX, November 15–16, 2013.  Some of the supports included Microsoft, Google, Andreessen Horowitz, eBay Inc and more.

HackTX 2013 yielded noteworthy ideas, prototypes, and business plans.  There were greater than 425 hackers in attendance at the 24-hour event all competing to create the most innovative hack.  Finalists presented today in front of a room of their peers and judges, Brett Hurt, Josh Baer, and Bob Metcalfe.

Whistlehero

Guitar hero for whistling.  This app was built completely in HTML and JavaScript.  Comments were made about the potential of the app being used to not only fine-tune whistling skills, but to learn the skill itself.

Relevant XKCD

Not only was relevant XKCD a funny presentation but the team has some serious potential as a search engine technology – fuzzy searching – searching when exact results are not known.

Alert Meet

Alert Meet aims to solve the room reservation problem found in libraries and co-working spaces.  Steve Lyons used a series of motion detectors to let users know when reserved rooms are in fact empty and available.

References

External links

 

Hacker culture
Software development events
University of Texas at Austin
Recurring events established in 2012
Culture of Austin, Texas
2012 establishments in Texas
Hackathons